Zhu Yunshan (November 3, 1887 – April 30, 1981) was a Chinese male politician, who served as the vice chairperson of the Chinese People's Political Consultative Conference.

References 

1887 births
1981 deaths
Politicians from Lu'an
Members of the Revolutionary Committee of the Chinese Kuomintang
Vice Chairpersons of the National Committee of the Chinese People's Political Consultative Conference
Vice Chairpersons of the National People's Congress
Members of the 1st Chinese People's Political Consultative Conference
Members of the Standing Committee of the 2nd Chinese People's Political Consultative Conference
Members of the Standing Committee of the 3rd Chinese People's Political Consultative Conference
Members of the Standing Committee of the 4th Chinese People's Political Consultative Conference
Delegates to the 1st National People's Congress
Delegates to the 2nd National People's Congress
Delegates to the 3rd National People's Congress
Members of the Standing Committee of the 4th National People's Congress